Thirteenth Brook drains Thirteenth Lake and empties into the Hudson River by North River, New York .

References

Rivers of New York (state)
Rivers of Warren County, New York